Eugene Raskin or Gene Raskin (Bronx, New York, September 5, 1909 – Manhattan, New York, June 7, 2004), was an American musician and playwright, author of the lyrics of the English version of the Russian song "Those Were the Days" and also of three books on architecture and adjunct professor at Columbia University (1936–1976).

Early life
Raskin was born in The Bronx in 1909. He studied at Columbia University and eventually became adjunct professor of architecture at his alma mater between 1936 and 1976.

He wrote two plays: in 1949 One's a Crowd, a comedy about an atomic scientist who develops four personalities after his experiments go horribly wrong; in 1951 a romantic play entitled Amata; and later, The Old Friend.  He also wrote a number of short pieces, including I'm on the Other Phone, Quartet for Two, and First Guitar (an autobiographical play about Gene's acquiring his first guitar), all of which were presented by the dramatist Steven Packard in his 1994-1995 thematically themed series Plays by Playwrights at the theatre collective Polaris North in New York City.

In 1954, Raskin published Architecturally Speaking; Sequel to Cities came in 1971 and Architecture and People in 1974.  He also wrote a novel, Stranger in my Arms. In the early 1960s, Raskin and his wife Francesca played folk music around Greenwich Village in New York. They released an album that included "Those Were The Days", which was initially taken up by the Limeliters.

Career success
For "Those Were the Days", Raskin had found a Russian tune by composer Boris Fomin, which Raskin had grown up hearing and for which he wrote lyrics in English, then illegally put a copyright on both tune and lyrics.

He and his wife Francesca were international balladeers for years and recorded several albums for Elektra Records. They played London's Blue Angel every year and always closed their show with "Those Were the Days".  Paul McCartney frequented the club when they were performing and, when the Beatles formed the Apple label, he secured the rights to "Those Were the Days" for a record by singer Mary Hopkin. The song was subsequently released in many versions by various artists, in over twenty languages.

At the peak of the song's success, a New York company made a commercial using Raskin's version of the melody with new lyrics, "Rokeach Ga-filte-fish, Rokeach Ga-filte-fish". saying that the tune was an old Russian folk tune and was in public domain. Raskin sued and won his case and a settlement, on the grounds that his version of the melody, which he had altered from its public-domain form to fit his lyrics, was sufficiently altered to be eligible for copyright.

At one time, Raskin opened mail containing a check for $26,000, which were the royalties just for the US mechanicals for that month. Raskin bought a home in Pollença, Mallorca, a Porsche Spyder and a sailboat, and lived very well off his royalties for the rest of his life.

He also got royalties from his novel Stranger in my Arms, his play The Old Friend, and his several books on architecture, which are still used in various universities around the world.

Publications
 Sequel to Cities: What Happens When Cities are Extinct Bloch Publishing (1969)

References

External links
 
 
 
 
 

20th-century American dramatists and playwrights
Songwriters from New York (state)
20th-century American Jews
People from the Bronx
2004 deaths
1909 births
20th-century American musicians
21st-century American Jews
Jewish American songwriters
Jewish architects
20th-century American architects
Jewish American non-fiction writers
Jewish American dramatists and playwrights
Jewish singers
Jewish American novelists
Jewish American academics
20th-century American academics
Columbia University faculty
Architects from New York City
20th-century American novelists